The 2021 BYU Cougars women's soccer team represented Brigham Young University during the 2021 NCAA Division I women's soccer season. The Cougars were coached for a 27th consecutive season by Jennifer Rockwood, who was co-coach in 1995 and became the solo head coach in 1996. Before 1995 BYU women's soccer competed as a club team and not as a member of the NCAA. Overall the Cougars have made the NCAA tournament in 21 of the 26 seasons that Rockwood has been the head coach. Joining Rockwood as assistant coaches are Brent Anderson (5th season) and Steve Magleby (4th season) with volunteer assistants Rachel Jorgensen (7th season) and McKinzie Young (9th season). The Cougars come off of a season where they were second in the WCC and went 11–4–1, 7–1–1 in the WCC. Their lone conference loss came to eventual national champion Santa Clara, whom the Cougars beat in Santa Clara in a non-conference match. For the 2021 season BYU returned 10 starters, including defending WCC Offensive Player of the Year Mikayla Colohan, who was drafted by the Orlando Pride. Cameron Tucker, who recorded eight goals and eight assists in 2020–21, also returned. The others returning due to an extra year of eligibility granted due to the COVID-19 pandemic include goalkeeper Cassidy Smith, Grace Johnson and Mikaylie Call. The incoming class features six new athletes and no new transfers. The Cougars went on to share the WCC crown, advance to their first ever College Cup, and tied in the championship with Florida State before losing on penalties to finish as national runner–up.

Personnel

Roster

Media

Television & Internet Streaming 
Most BYU women's soccer will have a TV broadcast or internet video stream available. BYUtv and WCC Network will once again serve as the primary providers. Information on these television and streaming broadcasts can be found under each individual match.

Nu Skin BYU Sports Network 

For an eighth consecutive season the BYU Sports Network will air BYU Cougars women's soccer games. Greg Wrubell will provide play-by-play for most games with Jason Shepherd filling-in when Wrubell has football or basketball duties. BYU Radio's KUMT station 107.9 FM will act as the flagship stations for women's soccer, though the BYU Sports App will carry a few games exclusively. For the national semifinal and championship SiriusXM's BYU Radio 143 station was added to provide a nationwide broadcast. 

Affiliates
BYU Radio- KUMT 107.9 FM

Schedule and results
{| class="toccolours" width=95% style="margin:1.5em auto; text-align:center;"
|-style=""
! colspan=2|2021 BYU Cougars women's soccer Game Log
|-
! colspan=2 | Legend:       = Win       = Loss       = Tie       = Canceled      Bold = BYU team member
|-style=""
! colspan=2 |Regular Season (13–4–1)
|- valign="top"
|

|-
|

|-
|

|-
|

|-style=""
! colspan=2 |Postseason (4–0–2)
|- valign="top"
|

|-
| * indicates a non-conference game. All rankings from the United Soccer Coaches Poll on the date of the contest.
|}

Announcers
Weber State: Spencer Linton,  Carla Haslam, & Kiki Solano (BYUtv); Greg Wrubell (BYU Cougars Live Radio App)
Ohio State: Jason Shepherd, Carla Haslam & Kiki Solano (BYUtv); Greg Wrubell & Rachel Jorgensen (BYU Radio)
Auburn: JJ Jackson & Mackenzie Hamilton (SEC+); Greg Wrubell (BYU Radio)
USC: Jason Shepherd, Carla Haslam & Kiki Solano (BYUtv); Greg Wrubell & Rachel Jorgensen (BYU Radio)
Arkansas: Brett Dolan & Josh Haley (SEC+); Greg Wrubell & Rachel Jorgensen (BYU Radio)
Marquette: Jason Shepherd & Landon Southwick (BYUtv.org); Greg Wrubell & Rachel Jorgensen (BYU Radio)
Utah: Krista Blunk (P12); Greg Wrubell & Rachel Jorgensen (BYU Radio)
Missouri: Jarom Jordan & Carla Haslam (BYUtv.org); Greg Wrubell & Rachel Jorgensen (BYU Radio)
Idaho State: Spencer Linton & Avery Walker (BYUtv.org); Greg Wrubell & Rachel Jorgensen (BYU Radio)
Utah State: Jarom Jordan & Landon Southwick (BYUtv.org); Jason Shepherd & Rachel Jorgensen (BYU Radio)
Gonzaga: Nezar Awad & Sam Mohan Lewin (WCC Net); Greg Wrubell & Rachel Jorgensen (BYU Radio)  
Saint Mary's: Spencer Linton & Carla Haslam (BYUtv.org); Greg Wrubell & Rachel Jorgensen (BYU Radio)
San Diego: Jarom Jordan & Carla Haslam (BYUtv.org); Jason Shepherd & Rachel Jorgensen (BYU Radio)
Pacific: Landon Southwick & Carla Haslam (BYUtv.org); Jason Shepherd & Rachel Jorgensen (BYU Radio)
San Francisco: Charles Wollin (WCC Net); Greg Wrubell & Rachel Jorgensen (BYU Radio)
Loyola Marymount: Jarom Jordan & Carla Haslam (BYUtv.org); Jason Shepherd & Rachel Jorgensen (BYU Radio)
Santa Clara: David Gentile (WCC Net); Jason Shepherd & Rachel Jorgensen (BYU Radio)
Portland: Ann Schatz & Angela Harrison  (WCC Net); Greg Wrubell & Rachel Jorgensen (BYU Radio)
Pepperdine: Landon Southwick & Carla Haslam (BYUtv.org); Greg Wrubell & Rachel Jorgensen (BYU Radio)
New Mexico: Spencer Linton, Carla Haslam, & Jason Shepherd (BYUtv); Greg Wrubell & Rachel Jorgensen (BYU Radio)
Alabama: Jason Patterson (ESPN+); Greg Wrubell & Rachel Jorgensen (BYU Radio)
Virginia: Jason Patterson & Paddy Foss (ACCNX); Jason Shepherd & Rachel Jorgensen (BYU Radio)
South Carolina: Jarom Jordan, Carla Haslam, & Kiki Solano (BYUtv); Landon Southwick & Rachel Jorgensen (BYU Cougars Live Radio App)
Santa Clara: Jenn Hildreth & Julie Foudy (ESPNU); Greg Wrubell & Rachel Jorgensen (BYU Radio)
Florida State: Jenn Hildreth & Julie Foudy (ESPNU); Greg Wrubell & Rachel Jorgensen (BYU Radio)

Rankings

References 

2021 in sports in Utah
2021 West Coast Conference women's soccer fall season
2021 team
2021 NCAA Division I women's soccer season
BYU
NCAA Division I Women's Soccer Tournament College Cup seasons